Adrian Stokes may refer to:

 Adrian Stokes (courtier) (1519–1586), English MP for Leicestershire
 Adrian Scott Stokes (1854–1935), British painter
 Adrian Stokes (critic) (1902–1972), British art critic
 Adrian V. Stokes (1945–2020), Internet pioneer